No Jeong-hun (born November 13, 1994), better known by his stage name I'll (아일) is a South Korean singer and songwriter who debuted in 2017. Besides his solo work, he is also the vocalist of Hoppipolla (호피폴라), a band that won a television talent show called Superband (슈퍼밴드) on JTBC in 2019.

Life and career 
No was born in 1994. He is the younger brother of singer-actor No Min-woo. He double majored in jazz piano and composition at the Boston Berklee College of Music.

He debuted as a solo singer-songwriter in 2017 with the single album Maybe We Are, produced and arranged by his brother. The album also entered the Oricon charts. His second single, titled Geu hae gyeoul (그 해 겨울) was released in 2018, and featured singer Juniel.

He also contributed to the original soundtrack of the television drama Partners for Justice 2, with a song called "Poison", written and produced by his brother. In October 2019, he performed the soundtrack "Breaking Dawn" for the television series Vagabond.

In 2020, No contributed to the original soundtrack of the tvN South Korean television series Oh My Baby.

Discography
Single albums
 Maybe We Are (2017)
 To My Dear (2018)
Singles
 Last Winter (그 해 겨울) (2018)
 You&I (너와 내가) (2020)
Original soundtrack
 Partners for Justice 2 OST (2019)
 Poison
 Vagabond OST (2019)
 Breaking Dawn
 Oh My Baby OST (2020)
 Love is all around
 Zombie Detective OST (2020)
 Be ok

Filmography

Variety show

References

External links 
 
 

1994 births
Living people
South Korean singer-songwriters
Berklee College of Music alumni